Kaveriyin Kanavan is a 1959 Indian Tamil-language film directed by A. K. Velan. The film stars Valayapathi G. Muthukrishnan and Sowcar Janaki.

Plot

There are two love stories. When Kaveri was a child her father visited his friend in Trichy with her. The friend had a young son, Ekambaram. Kaveri and Ekambaram played together. Ekambaram's mother did not like it. But Ekambaram's father married Ekambaram and Kaveri while they are still children as per the custom of those times. Soon after, Ekambaram went abroad for further studies. When he returned after studies, his mother said Kaveri had died. So he married another girl. But she dies. Ekambaram then discovers that Kaveri did not really die.

Anandan is Kaveri's brother living in another village. When he heard that his sister fell in a river he is saddened and begins a nomadic lifestyle. He joins a drama troupe. He meets a girl Vasantha and both become lovers. Anandan learns that Vasantha's mother is a woman of loose character. So he mistreats Vasantha. But Vasantha says she is innocent and should not be punished for her mother's faults. How the problems of the two couples are solved forms the rest of the story.

Cast
List adapted from the film's song book

Male cast
 Muthukrishnan
 Pakkirisami
 P. S. Dakshinamurthi
 Karikol Raju
 S. P. Veerasami
 Thangavel
 A. M. Maruthappa
 T. N. Krishnan
 Arjunan
 Rajagopal

Female cast
 Sowcar Janaki
 Suryakala
 C. K. Saraswathi
 Angamuthu
 Komalam
 Parvathi
Dance
 Kusala Kumari

Production
The film was produced and directed by A. K. Velan under his own banner Arunachalam Studios. He also wrote the story and dialogues. V. Ramamurthi handled the cinematography while V. B. Natarajan did the editing. Art direction was by A. B. Muthu. P. S. Gopalakrishnan was in charge of Choreography. Still photography was done by Thiruchi Arunachalam.

Soundtrack
Music was composed by K. V. Mahadevan while the lyrics were penned by Udumalai Narayana Kavi, Thanjai N. Ramaiah Dass and P. K. Muthuswami. The song Maappillai Vandhaar was a hit.

References

External links

1959 drama films
1959 films
Films scored by K. V. Mahadevan
Indian black-and-white films
Indian drama films